Mon Mane Na is a 1992 Indian Bengali romance film directed by Inder Sen featuring Prosenjit Chatterjee and Silpa Das.

Plot

Dipak (Prosenjit Chatterjee) and Shikha (Silpa Das) picnic with their friends and the couple enjoys ribbing each other. Dipak's barrister father, Bhabotosh Bose (Soumitra Chatterjee), has ordered him to study law as his main subject after he completes his B.Com. Shikha does not share the same perspective on life. She has three of her maternal uncles: the elder one (Rabi Ghosh) likes to act in plays, the middle one (Anup Kumar) was fond of songs and the last (Chinmoy Roy) was a karate master. The one thing common between all of them, they much loved Shikha.

They come to college separately to sit for their examinations, but Shikha finds she is unable to sit since her exam has already started. Shikha is crying when Dipak encounters her. She says that being orphaned and in the care of her maternal uncles, she is unable to face her uncles. Dipak feels for her and plays a trick to solve the problem.

Shikha and Dipak fall in love. Dipak introduces her to his mother; she likes the girl. His father saw them on a road and was not so quick with his opinion of her; he asks his wife Protima to learn of her background. Shikha is having a conversation with her Mejomama while remembering when, on the death of her father, her maternal uncles come for her. Shikha and Dipak argue over the latter's birthday; there is some confusion between Dipak and Shikha's elder maternal uncle; Dipak hammers the uncle.

Shikha's birthday is soon and Dipak wants to be at the celebration, but Shikha asks him to meet her in the park the next day. After some days Dipak's father decided to meet Shikha's maternal uncles to talk about his son's marriage. Shikha's uncles meet with the groom's father that when the uncles introduce themselves in relation to their passions, he is not assured of her suitability.

Dipak plays a prank to settle the situation. This time Dipak individually attempts to impress Shikha's uncles and he succeeds. Shikha's uncles decide that Shikha will marry the person they choose; they did not know that it was Dipak. They came to know about Dipak and are angry. Shikha is hurt by that action. The uncles realize that their anger is hurting Shikha and decide she should marry whom she wants. Dipak's father agrees with the change of heart of the uncles and Dipak and Shikha marry.

Cast
 Soumitra Chatterjee as Bhabotosh Bose
 Prosenjit Chatterjee as Deepak Bose
 Shilpa Das as Shikha
 Madhabi Mukherjee as Protima Bose
 Rabi Ghosh as Anil Chandro Dutta
 Anup Kumar as Pochu Chandro Dutta
 Chinmoy Roy as Nikhil Chandro Dutta
 Anamika Saha as Manoda

Soundtrack

References 

Bengali-language Indian films
1990s romance films
1990s Bengali-language films
Indian romance films
Films scored by Babul Bose